The Winthrop Fleet was a group of 11 ships led by John Winthrop out of a total of 16 funded by the Massachusetts Bay Company which together carried between 700 and 1,000 Puritans plus livestock and provisions from England to New England over the summer of 1630, during the first period of the Great Migration.

Motivation
The Puritan population in England had been growing for several years leading up to this time. They disagreed with the practices of the Church of England, whose rituals they viewed as superstitions. An associated political movement attempted to modify religious practice in England to conform to their views, and King James I wished to suppress this growing movement. Nevertheless, the Puritans eventually gained a majority in Parliament. James' son Charles came into direct conflict with Parliament, and viewed them as a threat to his authority. He temporarily dissolved Parliament in 1626, and again the next year, before dissolving it permanently in March 1629. The King's imposition of Personal Rule gave many Puritans a sense of hopelessness regarding their future in that country, and many prepared to leave it permanently for life in New England, and a wealthy group of leaders obtained a Royal Charter in March 1629 for the Massachusetts Bay Colony.

A fleet of five ships had departed a month previously for New England that included approximately 300 colonists led by Francis Higginson. However, the colony leaders and the bulk of the colonists remained in England for the time being to plan more thoroughly for the success of the new colony. In October 1629, the group who remained in England elected John Winthrop to be Governor of the Fleet and the Colony. Over the ensuing winter, the leaders recruited a large group of Puritan families, representing all manner of skilled labor to ensure a robust colony.

Voyage

 
The initial group  (Arbella and her three escorts)
departed Yarmouth, Isle of Wight on April 8, 
the remainder following in two or three weeks. Seven hundred men, women, and children were distributed among the ships of the fleet. The voyage was rather uneventful, the direction and speed of the wind being the main topic in Winthrop's journal, as it affected how much progress was made each day. There were a few days of severe weather, and every day was cold. The children were cold and bored, and there is a description of a game played with a rope that helped with both problems. Many were sick during the voyage.

The Winthrop Fleet was a well-planned and financed expedition that formed the nucleus of the Massachusetts Bay Colony. They were not the first settlers of the area; there was an existing settlement at Salem, started in about 1626 and populated by a few hundred Puritans governed by John Endicott, most of whom had arrived in 1629. Winthrop superseded Endicott as Governor of the Colony upon his arrival in 1630. The flow of Puritans to New England continued for another ten years, during a period known as the Great Migration.

Ships

Winthrop's journal lists the 11 ships in his fleet:

 Arbella: The flagship, designated "Admiral" in the consortship; named for Lady Arbella, wife of Isaac Johnson (see below)
 Talbot: Designated "Vice Admiral"; Henry Winthrop sailed on this ship, John Winthrop's son and first husband of Elizabeth Fones 
 Ambrose: Designated "Rear Admiral"
 Jewel: Designated a "Captain"
 Mayflower (not the Mayflower of the Pilgrims)
 Whale
 Success
 Charles 
 William and Francis 
 Hopewell 
 Trial

Six other ships arrived at Massachusetts Bay in 1630 for a total of seventeen that year.

Notable passengers

Nine leading men applied for the charter for the Massachusetts Bay Colony and came to New England in Winthrop's Fleet.

John Winthrop, Governor, and his sons Henry Winthrop and two minors
 Sir Richard Saltonstall, three sons, and two daughters
Isaac Johnson and his wife Lady Arabella, daughter of Thomas Clinton, 3rd Earl of Lincoln
Rev. George Phillips, co-founder of Watertown
Charles Fiennes 
Thomas Dudley, his wife, two sons, and four daughters
William Coddington, a Governor of Rhode Island Colony and his wife
William Pynchon and his wife and three daughters
William Vassall, for whom Vassalboro, Maine was named, and his wife
John Revell, merchant, who lent money to the Plymouth Colony, and who was chosen assistant to the Massachusetts Bay Colony
 Captain Thomas Wiggin, the first Governor of the Province of New Hampshire
Ezekiel Richardson, COnverse and Mousall were some of the original founders of Woburn ( from Charlestown). 
Other passengers of historical significance include:
 Robert Abell
 Stephen Bachiler Founder of Hampton, New Hampshire
 Simon Bradstreet and his wife Anne Bradstreet
 Jehu Burr, ancestor of Aaron Burr
 Samuel Cole, purveyor of the first tavern in the new world
 Edward Convers
 Thomas Mayhew
 Allan Perley
 Robert Seeley
 Isaac Stearns
John Taylor
 Captain John Underhill
 John Wilson, first minister of the First Church of Boston
 Captain Edward Johnson, a leading figure in colonial Massachusetts and one of the founders of Woburn, Massachusetts

A complete list of passengers is maintained by The Winthrop Society, a hereditary organization of descendants of the Winthrop Fleet and later Great Migration ships that arrived before 1634.

Notes

References

English colonization of the Americas
History of the Thirteen Colonies
Pre-statehood history of Massachusetts
New England Puritanism
1630 in the Thirteen Colonies
Winthrop family